Máté Fejes (born 8 February 1988 in Budapest) is a Hungarian former competitive ice dancer. With Zsuzsanna Nagy, he is the 2011 Pavel Roman Memorial champion and a two-time Hungarian national champion. They competed in the final segment at two European Championships.

Career 
Fejes began skating with Dorina Molnar by 2003. After competing on the novice level, they moved up to the junior ranks in the 2004–2005 season. They would appear at four ISU Junior Grand Prix (JGP) events, coached by Gabor Kolecsanszky in Budapest.

Fejes began his partnership with Emese Laszlo ahead of the 2006–2007 season. They appeared at six JGP events and qualified to the free dance at the 2008 World Junior Championships, finishing 20th overall. They competed at one senior international, placing 28th at the 2009 World Championships. They were coached by Sándor Nagy and Gabriella Remport in Budapest.

Fejes began competing with Nagy later in 2009. She broke her skull bone in November 2011 while they were practicing a lift. They became two-time national champions and appeared at six ISU Championships. They competed in the final segment at the 2012 European Championships in Sheffield, England, and 2013 European Championships in Zagreb, Croatia. They competed in the short dance at the 2012 World Championships in Nice, France, and 2013 World Championships in London, Ontario. They were coached by her father, Sandor Nagy.

Programs

With Nagy

With Laszlo

With Molnar

Competitive highlights
JGP: Junior Grand Prix

With Nagy

With Laszlo

With Molnar

References

External links

 
 

Living people
Hungarian male ice dancers
1988 births
Figure skaters from Budapest